The Turner House, also known as the Turner-Fulk House, is a historic house at 1701 Center Street in Little Rock, Arkansas.  It is a two-story wood-frame structure, with a gabled roof, clapboarded exterior, and brick foundation.  Its most prominent feature is a massive two-story temple portico, with a fully pedimented and modillioned gabled pediment supported by fluted Ionic columns. The main entry is framed by sidelight windows and an elliptical fanlight, and there is a shallow but wide balcony above.  The house was built in 1904–05 to a design by noted Arkansas architect Charles L. Thompson.

The house was listed on the National Register of Historic Places in 1982.

See also
National Register of Historic Places listings in Little Rock, Arkansas

References

Houses on the National Register of Historic Places in Arkansas
Colonial Revival architecture in Arkansas
Houses completed in 1902
Houses in Little Rock, Arkansas
National Register of Historic Places in Little Rock, Arkansas
Historic district contributing properties in Arkansas